Oracle CRM is a customer relationship management system created by Oracle Corporation. It includes a number of different cloud applications that can be deployed together or used individually to analyze customer data and help companies connect and manage sales, marketing, and customer support.

History
Oracle hired Mark Barrenechea in 1997 to build a CRM development team. That development team evolved into the CRM division of Oracle in 1998, the first year that Oracle CRM was released. Later, Barrenechea was responsible for the CRM half of Oracle's E-Business Suite (EBS) when he helped to bridge the separation between CRM and ERP by creating a single database that covered marketing, sales, order management, and accounting. This allowed Oracle to automate the entire CRM business flow, from lead to billing.

Transition to Oracle Advertising and CX 
In 2012, Oracle announced a new cloud-based focus on customer experience (CX) within its CRM business. At the time, CX was a relatively new term and referred to “the notion of providing a much more personalized approach to marketing and support." In 2021, Oracle combined its CX products with those from Oracle Data Cloud and renamed them Oracle Advertising and Customer Experience (CX). Oracle Advertising and Customer Experience (CX) is the name of Oracle's CRM system in the cloud.

Oracle CRM and Oracle Advertising and CX functionalities 
Oracle provides the following CRM functionalities in its products:

 Lead management through Oracle Marketing
 Contact management through Oracle Sales
 Reporting and analytics through Oracle Analytics
 Sales force automation through Oracle Sales
 Mobile CRM through Oracle Sales
 AI through Oracle Sales and Oracle Marketing
 Email marketing through Oracle Marketing
 Sales forecasting through Oracle Sales
 Marketing automation through Oracle Marketing

Oracle's variations of CRM
Oracle offers different installations of the CRM system:
 On premises system
 PeopleSoft Enterprise CRM (formerly owned by PeopleSoft, which was acquired by Oracle in 2005)
eBusiness Suite CRM
Siebel CRM
Cloud
Oracle Advertising and Customer Experience (CX)
Advertising
Marketing
Sales
Service

Oracle CRM acquisitions 
2005

 Siebel Systems

2010

 Art Technology Group (ATG)

2011

 RightNow Technologies

2012

 Eloqua

2013

 Compendium
 Responsys
 BigMachines

2014

 TOA Technologies
 BlueKai

2015

 Maxymiser

2018

 DataFox

References

Customer relationship management software
Oracle software
Customer relationship management software companies